Espen Lysdahl (born 19 April 1990) is a Norwegian alpine ski racer. He represents Asker Skiklubb. He competed at the 2015 World Championships in Beaver Creek, USA, in the slalom, where he placed 16th.

World Cup results

World Championship results

References

External links
 
 Espen Lysdahl World Cup standings at the International Ski Federation
 

1990 births
Living people
People from Asker
Norwegian male alpine skiers
Place of birth missing (living people)
Sportspeople from Viken (county)